Ahmet Şenol (5 March 1926 – 7 April 2019) was a Turkish wrestler. He competed at the 1948 Summer Olympics and the 1952 Summer Olympics.

References

External links
 

1926 births
2019 deaths
Turkish male sport wrestlers
Olympic wrestlers of Turkey
Wrestlers at the 1948 Summer Olympics
Wrestlers at the 1952 Summer Olympics
Place of birth missing